Muzaffarpur is a city located in Muzaffarpur district in the Tirhut region of the Indian state of Bihar. It serves as the headquarters of the Tirhut division, the Muzaffarpur district and the Muzaffarpur Railway District. It is the fourth most populous city in Bihar.

Muzaffarpur is famous for Shahi lychees and is known as the Lychee Kingdom. Shahi litchi is set to become the fourth product from Bihar, after jardalu mango, katarni rice and Magahi paan (betel leaf) to get the Geographical Indication (GI) tag. It is situated on the banks of the perennial Budhi Gandak River, which flows from the Someshwar Hills of the Himalayas.

Etymology
The current city was established in 1875 during the British Raj for administrative convenience, by dividing the Tirhut district and was named after an aumil, Muzaffar Khan; thus the city came to be known as Muzaffarpur.

History

The city was founded by Muẓaffar Khan in the 18th century and was constituted a municipality in 1864. A major road and rail hub, it is a trade centre on the route between Patna (south) and Nepal (north).Lychee,sweet corn,Mango,Vegetables Rice and sugar milling alongside cutlery manufacturing are the chief industries.

In 1972, the Sitamarhi and Vaishali districts were split off from Muzaffarpur.

Geography
The city lies in a highly active seismic zone of India. In the disastrous earthquake on 15 January 1934, much of the town suffered severe damage and many people died. It has an average elevation of 47 meters (154 feet). This saucer shaped, low-centered town lies on the great Indo-Gangetic plains of Bihar, over Himalayan silt and sand brought by the glacier-fed and rain-fed meandering rivers of the Himalayas.

Climate
Muzaffarpur has humid subtropical climate (Cwa) under Köppen climate classification. The summer, between April and June, is extremely hot and humid (28/40 °C, 90% max.) and winter is pleasantly cool, around 06/20 °C. Rainfall in Muzaffarpur City is comparatively less to the other parts of Bihar.

Demographics
As of the 2011 India census, Muzaffarpur had a population of 393,724. Males constituted 52.96% (208,509) of the population and females 47.04% (185,215). Muzaffarpur had a literacy rate of 74.74%. Male literacy was 77.99%, and female literacy was 71.08%.

As per 2011 census data, there are total 275,233 Hindus whereas 74,680 Muslims and 1,352 Christians along with other small minorities.

Economy
In 2006 the Ministry of Panchayati Raj named Muzaffarpur one of the country's 250 most backward districts (out of a total of 640). It is one of the 36 districts in Bihar currently receiving funds from the Backward Regions Grant Fund Programme (BRGF).

Lychee

The lychee crop, which is available from May to June, is mainly cultivated in the districts of Muzaffarpur and surrounding districts. Cultivation of litchi covers approximately an area of about 25,800 hectares producing about 300,000 tonnes every year. Litchi are exported to big cities of India like Mumbai, Kolkata, and even to other countries. India's share in the world litchi market amounts to less than 1%. The names of the litchi produced in Muzaffarpur are Shahi and China. The fruits are known for excellent aroma and quality.

Bihar's contribution in the production of lychee in about 40 percent of lychee produced in India.

Bihar has emerged as a brewery hub with major domestic and foreign firms setting up production units in the state. Vijay Mallya's group, United Breweries Group, is setting up a production unit to make litchi-flavoured wine, in Muzaffarpur in 2012. The company has leased litchi gardens.

Muzaffarpur based Prabhat Zarda Factory is one of the leading tobacco manufacturers of India.

Transport

Railways

Muzaffarpur Junction railway station (MFP) is a main A1 Category railway junction in Sonpur Division of East Central Railway, having total 8 platforms, with three suburban stations, Ram Dayalu Nagar, Narayanpur Anant (Sherpur) and Jubba Sahni. More than 200 trains regularly visits this 136+ year old railway junction.

Roads

National Highway 57 (India) comes via Gorakhpur, Motihari, Mehsi and crosses Muzaffarpur and National Highway 57 (India) goes to Darbhanga, Purnia. The East–West Corridor crosses Muzaffarpur thus connecting it to all the major towns and cities in India. National Highway 22 (India) starting from Hajipur passes through Muzaffarpur and connects Muzaffarpur to Sitamarhi. National Highway 28 (India) connects Mehsi and Muzaffarpur to Barauni, all 6 National Highways having junction there.

Airport
Muzaffarpur Airport (IATA: MZU, ICAO: VEMZ) is located in Patahi of Muzaffarpur city (besides NH 722 Muzaffarpur - Chhapra (Rewa Ghat)) in the state of Bihar, India. It was operable from 1967 to 1982, on a regular basis. Currently it is not in operations, commercially.

Darbhanga Airport is the nearest domestic airport roughly 64 km away by road.  Patna Airport is the nearest customs airport roughly 70 km from the city.

Education

University 
 Babasaheb Bhimrao Ambedkar Bihar University
 Muzaffarpur institute of technology (mit muzaffarpur)

Colleges
Langat Singh College
Muzaffarpur Institute of Technology
Mahant Darshan Das Mahila College
S.K.J. Law College
Sri Krishna Medical College and Hospital

Schools 
● Birla Open Minds International School , TURKI Chhajjan Road , Opposite to RDJM Hospital and Medical College , Muzaffarpur

● Delhi Public School (DPS) , TURKI ( NH 77 near Turki Observational Point -"OP") MUZAFFARPUR
Kendriya Vidyalaya Muzaffarpur
Prabhat Tara School, Chakkar Maidan
DAV Public School, Malighat
DAV Public School, Bakhri
St. Xavier International School, Adarshgram
St. Joseph's Senior Secondary School
Holy mission senior secondary school,Dighra
Shanti Niketan Awasiya Bal Vidyalaya,Shantinagar, Ahiyapur,
OXFORD SENIOR SECONDARY SCHOOL, RAGHUNATHPUR,

Notable people

Ketan Kundan, Indian Journalist, TV Today Network, Aaj Tak, Good News Today
Maghfoor Ahmad Ajazi, political activist and freedom fighter
Rambriksh Benipuri Indian freedom movement activist, eminent writer of Hindi literature
Sudhir Kumar Chaudhary, sports spectator and fan of the Indian Cricket Team
Veena Devi, Indian politician, Member of 17th Lok Sabha
Devaki Nandan Khatri, the author of Chandrakanta (in Hindi)
Arunabh Kumar, founder and ex-CEO of TVF
Shahbaz Nadeem, Indian cricketer
Shreya Narayan, Bollywood actress
Aishwarya Nigam, a Bollywood playback singer
Rajendra Prasad, India's first president, worked as a professor of English in Langat Singh College
Jubba Sahni, freedom fighter
Uday Shankar media executive and former journalist, president of FICCI, The Walt Disney Company Asia Pacific, and chairman of Star India and The Walt Disney Company India
Janki Ballabh Shastri, Hindi poet, writer and critic
Baikunth Shukla revolutionary hanged by the British in 1934
Yogendra Shukla revolutionary, Indian freedom movement activist, served time at Kalapani
Basawon Singh revolutionary, Indian freedom movement activist
Chandeshwar Prasad Narayan Singh, diplomat and freedom fighter
Dinesh Prasad Singh, Indian politician
Kishori Sinha Indian politician and educationalist
Prabhat Ranjan, Social Entrepreneur, Educationist
Rajni Ranjan Sahu, Member Rajya Sabha, 1984–1996 
Sunil Sahu, Educator in the US
Mridula Sinha, former Governor of Goa (20142019)
Richa Soni, TV actress
Ajay Nishad, Indian Politician, Member of 17th Lok Sabha
Manish Singh, Indian Entrepreneur, Founder and CEO of ZZED Media
Muhammad Shafi Daudi, he was a prominent freedom fighter and Scholar. Mahatma Gandhi stayed at his home when he visited Motihari and started Satyagraha

See also
 Appan Samachar
 List of cities in Bihar
 Sujini embroidery work of Bihar

References

External links

 Official website of Muzaffarpur District
 Official website of Tirhut Division
 

 
Cities and towns in Muzaffarpur district
Populated places in Mithila, India